Camata  may refer to:
 Camata River, a river in Bolivia
 the unripe acorns of the valonia oak